Leucozonia is a genus of sea snails, marine gastropod mollusks in the family Fasciolariidae, the spindle snails, the tulip snails and their allies.

Species
Species within the genus Leucozonia include:
 Leucozonia cerata (Wood, 1828)
 Leucozonia granulilabris (Vermeij & Snyder, 2004)
 Leucozonia leucozonalis (Lamarck, 1822)
 Leucozonia nassa (Gmelin, 1791) - type species
 Leucozonia ocellata (Gmelin, 1791)
 Leucozonia ponderosa Vermeij & Snyder, 1998
 Leucozonia rudis (Reeve, 1847)
 Leucozonia triserialis (Lamarck, 1822)
 Leucozonia tuberculata (Broderip, 1833)

fossil species:
 Leucozonia rhomboidea (Gabb, 1873) from the Gurabo Formation (early Pliocene) of the Dominican Republic
 Leucozonia striatula Vermeij, 1997, from the Cercado (late Miocene) and basal Gurabo Formations of the Dominican Republic

synonyms
 Leucozonia caribbeana Weisbord, 1962: synonym of Leucozonia nassa (Gmelin, 1791)
 Leucozonia jacarusoi Petuch, 1987: synonym of Leucozonia nassa (Gmelin, 1791)
 Leucozonia knorrii (Deshayes, 1843): synonym of Leucozonia nassa (Gmelin, 1791)
 Leucozonia smaragdula (Linnaeus, 1758) is a synonym of Latirolagena smaragdula (Linnaeus, 1758)
 Leucozonia trinidadensis Mallard & Robin, 2005: synonym of Leucozonia nassa (Gmelin, 1791)

References

 Snyder M.A. (2003). Four new species of Latirus (Gastropoda: Fasciolariidae) from the Philippine Islands and the southern Caribbean. Iberus 20(3): 1-9.

External links

Fasciolariidae
Extant Miocene first appearances